The 1990–91 snooker season was a series of snooker tournaments played between August 1990 and May 1991. The following table outlines the results for ranking and the invitational events.


Calendar

Official rankings 

The top 16 of the world rankings, these players automatically played in the final rounds of the world ranking events and were invited for the Masters.

Notes

References

External links

1990
Season 1991
Season 1990